Ha Sung-min (born June 13, 1987) is a South Korean football player who plays for Gyeongnam FC in K League 1. His brother Ha Dae-sung is also a footballer.

References

External links

 

1987 births
Living people
South Korean footballers
Incheon United FC players
Jeonbuk Hyundai Motors players
Busan IPark players
Gimcheon Sangmu FC players
Ulsan Hyundai FC players
Kyoto Sanga FC players
Gyeongnam FC players
K League 1 players
South Korean expatriate footballers
Expatriate footballers in Qatar
South Korean expatriate sportspeople in Qatar
Sportspeople from Incheon
Association football midfielders